3rd Visual Effects Society Awards
February 16, 2005

Best Visual Effects - Motion Picture: 
Harry Potter and the Prisoner of Azkaban

The 3rd Visual Effects Society Awards, given  on 16 February 2005 at the Hollywood Palladium, honored the best visual effects in film and television of 2004. An edited version of the ceremony was broadcast on HD Net.

Winners and nominees
(Winners in bold)

Honorary Awards
Lifetime Achievement Award:
Robert Zemeckis

George Melies Award for Pioneering:
Robert Abel

Board of Directors Award:
Don Shay

Film

Television

Other categories

References

External links
 Visual Effects Society

2004
Visual Effects Society Awards
Visual Effects Society Awards
Visual Effects Society Awards
Visual Effects Society Awards